Schöfweg is a municipality in the district of Freyung-Grafenau in Bavaria in Germany.

References

Freyung-Grafenau